is a Japanese footballer currently playing as a defender for Ehime FC of J3 League from 2023, on loan from Omiya Ardija.

Career
Yoshinaga begin first professional career with Omiya Ardija from 2019.

Yoshinaga was loaned out to Thespakusatsu Gunma in 2021.

Yoshinaga loaned again to Ehime FC from 2023 season.

Career statistics

Club
.

Notes

References

External links

2000 births
Living people
Sportspeople from Saitama Prefecture
Association football people from Saitama Prefecture
Japanese footballers
Japan youth international footballers
Association football defenders
J2 League players
J3 League players
Omiya Ardija players
Thespakusatsu Gunma players
Ehime FC players